An Information Assurance Security Officer (IASO) in the United States Army is primarily responsible for the security and integrity of the information systems in his or her area of responsibility.

References 
 DoD Instruction 8500.2
 Information Assurance Vulnerability Alert
 
 

United States Army job titles